Nowjeh Deh Daraq (also Romanized as Nowjeh Deh Daraq and Nowjeh-ye Deh Daraq; also known as Darreh Noqadī Mollā Yaḩyá, Darreh Nowqadī Mollā Yaḩyá, Noojeh Deh Daragh, Tūrān Now Deh, and Turan-Nuvedi) is a village in Bonab Rural District, in the Central District of Marand County, East Azerbaijan Province, Iran. At the 2006 census, its population was 97, in 28 families.

References 

Populated places in Marand County